Tamil cinema, popularly known as Kollywood, is the filmmaking industry based in Chennai, Tamil Nadu. The films are made primarily in Tamil language. The following is a list of the highest-grossing Tamil films. The Tamil film industry made the first nationally distributed film across India in 1944 with Haridas.

Highest-grossing Tamil films worldwide
Tamil films which grossed a minimum of 100+ crores worldwide are listed here.

Highest-grossing Tamil films by year

Highest-grossing Tamil film franchises

See also
 List of highest-grossing Indian films
 List of highest-grossing South Indian films

Notes

References

Tamil